IJsselmeervogels is a Dutch amateur football club. With seven national amateur titles IJsselmeervogels is the most successful amateur club in the Netherlands. The Reds come from Bunschoten – Spakenburg, in the Dutch province Utrecht, on the shores of the former IJsselmeer lake. IJsselmeervogels is placed first on the all time rankings, measured by the number of points scored in games at the highest amateur level in Saturday league football. (Since introducing in 1970 it was first named First Class 'Eerste Klasse' and later Head Class 'Hoofdklasse'). These days, IJsselmeervogels plays in the Tweede Divisie, the highest amateur league.

History

Early years 
The club was formed in 1932 and in the early days, the club had a number of different names such as VVIJV, V.V. IJsselmeer and n.a.s. (Na Arbeid Sport) (Sport after Labour) and soon the club colors of IJsselmeervogels were red and white. The kit consists of a white shirt with deep red course (such as Ajax) and a red suit. The stockings were initially red with a white band, but in recent years, these more or less silently changed into totally white.

In the first years IJsselmeervogels played in a regional bond in Utrecht, but over time the club always played in the highest possible class in the district. And not without success; nearly every year they played for the title with fellow town's club SV Spakenburg and region clubs like HSV De Zuidvogels and SV Huizen. IJsselmeervogels took various titles and cups and on several occasions in the 1950s and 1960s they managed the Championship. After the sixties, the KNVB made a national amateur competition, the First Class (Eerste Klasse). Placement was harder than expected but after a play-off with VRC and VV Rijsoord IJsselmeervogels qualified.

Fellow town's club and rival SV Spakenburg did also qualify for the First Class. At that time IJsselmeervogels moved to the same complex as Spakenburg and since then only the canteens, a fence and some trees separate both clubs. The second year that IJsselmeervogels participated in the new class (season 71/72) the club became champion just like in 72/73.

1975: Sports team of the year 
National fame was gained in the 1974/75 season. IJsselmeervogels had qualified for the Dutch national Cup, the KNVB Cup. SV Limburgia and SC Amersfoort (the former professional club from the nearby large town) were defeated 1–0 and 4–1. Subsequently IJsselmeervogels won their match against FC Groningen, at that time leader of the first division, 2–1 and reached the quarter finals.

In March 1975, IJsselmeervogels played away in Alkmaar against AZ, the number 5 in the Premier Division 1974/75. AZ fielded celebrated players like Kees Kist and Hugo Hovenkamp, but Jan Vedder and Jaan de Graaf put the unpaid amateurs on a 0–2 lead. AZ came back to 2–2 and in extra time there were no more goals. The match had to be decided on penalty kicks. Thanks to saves by goalkeeper Jos de Feyter, IJsselmeervogels reached the semi-finals.

Singer Peter Koelewijn of 'Peter en zijn Rockets' composed a gramophone record for IJsselmeervogels, sung by the players: Vogels van het IJsselmeer (Birds of the IJsselmeer) "Alle Vogels vliegen" ("All Birds fly").

This victory is considered the high point in club history and was celebrated in the village. In the semi finals, in the Deventer Adelaarshorst, FC Twente proved far too strong, winning 6–0. Following this excellent KNVB cup run, IJsselmeervogels received the predicate 'Dutch Sports team of the year'. IJsselmeervogels is the only amateur club that has received this title.

1976–1989 
During the remainder of the 1970s and 1980s IJsselmeervogels were crowned champions a number of times. In 1976, 1977 and 1983, with teams largely from the own village, IJsselmeervogels won three national titles. At the end of the 1980s, the club went through a bad period. The club veered between using players from their own town and drafting in players from other parts of the country. There was a change in policy about 1988. IJsselmeervogels started to pay their previously unpaid players, as other amateur clubs already did. As yet unsuccessful, this earned a seven-year period. This period also knew some supporters riots.

1990s 
In the mid-1990s the Board decided to appoint Erik Assink as trainer. He got a team with some young home grown players supplemented by a few veterans. In 1995, IJsselmeervogels won all amateur titles on the Dutch fields. The largely unchanged squad also won the Saturday titles in 1998 and 1999, after which the team slowly switched to a new team, which took several years.

2000s 
From 2003, after attracting five players from then-champion but nearly bankrupt SV Huizen, performances were getting better. With Philip den Haan joining as their new trainer the results improved further, culminating in winning the championship for clubs playing on Saturday. ASWH (overal champions) and Excelsior '31 were however too strong.

In the season 2005–2006, for the fifth time in its history, IJsselmeervogels became the overall amateur champions. Under the guidance of trainer Willem Leushuis they won the amateur title again, with competitors ASWH, VV SHO and GVVV being kept at a distance. Dogan Corneille, the leader on their midfield and former professional player, used his experience to guide the team and made his team mates play better football.  First team players from Spakenburg were left back Henri de Graaf and right-back Jan Pieter Hartog. After winning the league title IJsselmeervogels had to play ONS Sneek and Rijnsburgse Boys. In this competition IJsselmeervogels won the title with minimal difference, with Rijnsburgse Boys being a close match. Eventually  penalty shootouts made the difference and gave IJsselmeervogels their thirteenth Saturday title. The overall amateur title went between Türkiyemspor and IJsselmeervogels. On Saturday 10 June 2006 IJsselmeervogels lost by 1–2, but the deciding game on June 17, 2006, was won by IJsselmeervogels by 0–3 away at Türkiyemspor. After 11 YEARS, IJsselmeervogels was again the best amateur club in the Netherlands. After this successes some players were picked up by some professional clubs. Kwong-Wah Steinrath (top scorer) was picked up by Haarlem and defender Stanley Tailor left IJsselmeervogels for FC Emmen. The most notable transfer was left winger Gijs van Manen, who had mostly been on the bench only a year earlier at SDV Barneveld. He went on to play in the reserves of FC Utrecht.

In 2006–2007 IJsselmeervogels again had a pretty good selection. Dogan Corneille, who had been so important for the team the previous season, was replaced by Kevin Winter, and his brother Jeffrey Winter replaced Steinraht as a striker. He scored no less than 26 goals in 25 League matches. In mid-November trainer Willem Leushuis announced his sudden retirement, having received an offer he could not refuse from Kuwait. His successor, Cees Lok, came at the right time. His first League game was against rivals Spakenburg (1–2 win). Later in the season, in February, the new all-seater covered stand, seating up to 1,050 spectators, was opened. On 21 April 2007 at home, IJsselmeervogels won the league title for the third time in a row. On the day, neighbours Spakenburg were beaten after a goal by Dennis van der Steen (penalty) and Jeffrey Winter scoring 2-1 to win the match. The Saturday title also fell prey for IJsselmeervogels. With great display of power the first 2 games against Rijnsburgse Boys and HHC Hardenberg were won, which meant a draw in their third match would suffice for IJsselmeervogels to win the title. Eventually they won their final game 2–1. However, the overall amateur title didn't go to IJsselmeervogels. At the Westmaat IJsselmeervogels and SV Argon tied, 1–1. At Meidrecht IJsselmeervogels lost to Argon by 4–3 in extra time.

The season 2007/2008 was much less successful. The selection looked stronger up front but had dropped some quality in midfield. Kwong-Wah Steinraht and Gijs van Manen returned after a one-year adventure from HFC Haarlem and FC Utrecht and Joost Kuhlmann and Bryan Simons (both Rijnsburgse Boys) joined. IJsselmeervogels also picked up Mattheus Hoop and Philip van der Kolk as new goalkeepers and got Frits van Putten as a replacement for Kevin Winter, who returned to FC Lisse. Also leaving were Dogan Corneille (BVV Barendrecht), Jaap de Feijter (Veensche Boys), Tom Gesgarz (DOVO), Alexander de Jong, Paul Verboom, Sjoerd van der Waal (all ASWH) and Erwin Schouten (VV Nunspeet). On August 15, 2007, it was announced that coach Cees Lok would make an immediate switch to FC Twente. He joined the technical staff, mainly to deal with young FC Twente. As a replacement the experienced Harry van den Ham signed for a year. On September 22, 2007, a record from the 1970s was equalled. IJsselmeervogels was undefeated for 29 League matches after beating Bennekom. The last time IJsselmeervogels had lost at home during the regular season was on April 2, 2005, against SV Deltasport from Vlaardingen. On 24 December, Harry van den Ham was fired and some days later Roy Wesseling was announced as the new coach. IJsselmeervogels eventually ended in a disappointing fifth position with twelve wins, six draws and eight losses.

Season 2008/2009 resulted in the thirtieth league title for IJsselmeervogels. With an almost completely new team including a number of former professional players, led by Roy Wesseling, IJsselmeervogels dominated the Saturday Hoofdklasse B from the first round. The reds were on top of the league from beginning until the end. Eventually, the title was won in the away match against SV Geinoord, which after that match relegated to the First Class (Eerste Klasse). The Saturday amateur Championship was less successful for IJsselmeervogels. In a competition with Rijnsburgse Boys and Harkemase Boys, IJsselmeervogels turned out to be second best.

In the first half of the season 2009/2010 the results were not as good. Some players and coach Roy Wesseling didn't gell. The board of IJsselmeervogels fired Wesseling on December 22, 2009. His successor Jan Zoutman was officially announced on 29 December. Under his leadership performances improved drastically and in the second half of the season IJsselmeervogels just dropped points in one game. On Saturday 8 May IJsselmeervogels became league champion for the 31st time and celebrated the 50th championship in the history of IJsselmeervogels. Three weeks later, IJsselmeervogels won the overall Saturday title for the 15th time and after that the club won the 6th national amateur title by beating VV Gemert twice (0–1 and 4–0).

In the summer of 2008 Supporters club NAS was established. NAS stands for Na Arbeid Sport (Sport After Labour), which was a former name of IJsselmeervogels. The Supporters club has over 500 members. NAS provides atmosphere around matches of IJsselmeervogels. NAS also arranges darts evenings, parties and a wide range of other activities.

2010s 
From the 2010/2011 season IJsselmeervogels played in the Topklasse Saturday, in 2016 renamed Derde Divisie.

IJsselmeervogels got their first prize of the season by winning the Super Cup against VV Dongen, winner of the national KNVB Cup for amateurs. For the second time in the history of IJsselmeervogels the Super Cup for amateurs was won. In the first year of the Top Class Saturday (Topklasse Zaterdag) on 7 May 2011 the title was won with a 5–0 victory over SC Genemuiden. Three weeks later IJsselmeervogels were crowned as national amateur champion of the Netherlands for the seventh time in their history. FC Oss (that uses her right to promote straight to the First Division (Jupiler League) is twice defeated by 2–0.

The 2011/2012 season started with a match against KNVB Cup winner Achilles '29 from Groesbeek. On Sportpark De Westmaat IJsselmeervogels lost 1–2. At the end of the season Achilles '29 was also Dutch champion by defeating Saturday champion SV Spakenburg. IJsselmeervogels ended the competition at a disappointing sixth place.

The 2012/2013 season had a bad start. Coach Jan Zoutman received a red card in the opening match against CVV de Jodan Boys (2–1 defeat) because he knocked down a linesman. Zoutman was later suspended for three months. Despite the poor results, the contract of Zoutman was renewed by a year in December. Through bad results after the winter holiday, the board of IJsselmeervogels decided to end the contract of Jan Zoutman, with five matches to go. Three days after this decision IJsselmeervogels appointed Gert Kruys as their new head coach. In the 2013/2014 season Kruys appointed Maikel de Harder, a local boy, as the captain of IJsselmeervogels. On Saturday 5 May IJsselmeervogels secured itself a place in the Topklasse Saturday where it also played in season 2013/14. IJsselmeervogels ended the season on an, again disappointing, twelfth position.

At the end of the 2015/16 season, they didn’t qualify for the new formed Tweede Divisie, the highest amateur level of the Dutch football pyramid. After one season in the Derde Divisie, IJsselmeervogels entered the Tweede Divisie by winning the Saturday championship of the Derde Divisie.

Current squad 
As of 9 September 2020

Derby IJsselmeervogels – Spakenburg 
IJsselmeervogels and SV Spakenburg have been playing at the same level since they were founded. Over the years there an atmosphere had emerged around the derby matches which is unique in amateur football. The club of "the people and the fishermen" 
(IJsselmeervogels, also known as "The Reds") against the "farmers and clerks" (SV spakenburg, "the Blues"). Their rivalry reached boiling point in 1987, when during the second but last match a bomb made by a supporter of IJsselmeervogels exploded and a linesman was wounded. In the years that followed, until the mid-1990s, the clubs were separated. In 1999, however, the relationship between the two clubs cooled considerably when Spakenburg offered a much money to sign two star players from the "red championship team" (Gérard van der Nooij and Pascal de Bruijn) and have them play for "the Blues". The affair becomes so big that  local government banned de derby for a few year. Since 2002 the peace has returned and IJsselmeervogels and Spakenburg are playing against each other again. It is estimated that the edition of 16 April 2011 was visited by almost 9,000 people. In the stands there are many crowd chants and there is always a great atmosphere. The media spend much time on the derby, which is covered in sports magazines like Voetbal International and Dutch National broadcaster NOS.

Besides neighbour Spakenburg there are more big opponents for IJsselmeervogels: SV Urk, VV Sparta Nijker, VV DOVO, SV Huizen and especially Quick Boys are clubs with many spectators. During the season 2004/05 Quick Boys, from Katwijk, was the biggest opponent. On the final match day Quick Boys (former club of Dirk Kuyt) was defeated 3–2, with 7,000 spectators watching.

Results of the derby since 1970 (introduction First Class (Eerste Klasse))

Honors

IJsselmeervogels was founded in 1932 and became champions for the first time on June 17, 1937. The 30th title was celebrated on April 18, 2009. IJsselmeervogels won against SV Geinoord. 6–1. IJsselmeervogels was champion and Geinoord relegated to First Class (Eerste Klasse).

 Dutch Derde Divisie Saturday (1×)
 2017
 Dutch Amateur champions (7×)
 1976, 1977, 1983, 1995, 2006, 2010, 2011
 Dutch Amateur champions Saturday (From 2011 as champions Top Class Saturday (16×)
 1954, 1955, 1956, 1964, 1976, 1977, 1982, 1983, 1984, 1995, 1998, 1999, 2006, 2007, 2010, 2011
 Dutch Amateur league Saturday champions (31×)
 1937, 1946, 1947, 1948, 1954, 1955, 1956, 1957, 1958, 1959, 1964, 1965, 1966, 1968, 1972, 1973, 1976, 1977, 1982, 1983, 1984, 1986, 1988, 1995, 1998, 1999, 2005, 2006, 2007, 2009, 2010
 KNVB Cup Amateurs Saturday amateurs  (3×)
 1957, 1962, 1974
 Districts Cup (West 1) (5×)
 1981, 1996, 2003, 2014, 2015
 National KNVB Cup for amateurs (1×)
 1996
 Super Cup Amateurs (2×)
 2006, 2010
 Dutch Sportsteam of the year (1×)
 1975

Ranking IJsselmeervogels per season

References

External links
  Official website

 
Football clubs in the Netherlands
Association football clubs established in 1932
1932 establishments in the Netherlands
Football clubs in Bunschoten